Kuwait competed at the 2012 Summer Olympics in London, from 27 July to 12 August 2012. This was the nation's twelfth consecutive appearance at the Olympics.

On May 24, the International Olympic Committee announced that Kuwaiti athletes would compete under the Olympic flag, as Independent Olympic Athletes, at the Olympics due to two-year suspension of the Kuwait Olympic Committee. On July 14, Kuwaiti athletes were allowed to participate under their own flag, after the suspension was lifted.

Kuwait Olympic Committee sent a total of 10 athletes to the Games, 8 men and 2 women, to compete in 4 different sports. Trap shooter Fehaid Al-Deehani, who participated at his sixth Olympics as the team's most experienced member, reprised his role to be Kuwait's flag bearer at the opening ceremony. He also set the nation's historical milestone, as the first Kuwaiti athlete to win more than a single medal in Olympic history.

Medalists

Athletics

Kuwaiti athletes have so far achieved qualifying standards in the following athletics events (up to a maximum of 3 athletes in each event at the 'A' Standard, and 1 at the 'B' Standard):

Men
Track & road events

Field events

Shooting

Kuwait has ensured berths in the following events of shooting: 

Men

Women

Swimming

Kuwaiti swimmers have so far achieved qualifying standards in the following events (up to a maximum of 2 swimmers in each event at the Olympic Qualifying Time (OQT), and potentially 1 at the Olympic Selection Time (OST)):

Men

Women

Table tennis

Kuwait has qualified one athlete.

References

External links

Nations at the 2012 Summer Olympics
2012
2012 in Kuwaiti sport